Vladimir Nikolayevich Myasishchev (10 July 1893 – 4 October 1973) was a famous Soviet psychologist and developmental psychologist.

Biography
Myasishchev was born in Latvia. He studied at the medical faculty of Saint Petersburg Psychoneurological Institute and graduated from it in 1919. Director of the Psychoneurological Institute in 1939–1961. In 1945–1973 professor of Leningrad University, where he was instrumental in establishing the Faculty of Psychology.

Scientific work
In 1914 Myasishchev published his first scientific article. He researched microstructural changes to brain tissue accompanied by functional impairment of its activity. His research encompasses problems of Psychopathology, Clinical Psychophysiology and Medical Psychology. Proposed the term "systemic neuroses" describing diseases conditioned by reactive psychogenetic factors to which the patient's personality reacts with disturbances that are fixated and intensified in the future. Researched borderline states and their treatment, sought to distinguish them from neuroses, studied the problem of norm, psychosomatic health and its restoration.  Myasishchev's conceptions were influenced by psychoanalysis.

In 1921 he contributed towards the First Conference on Scientific Organization of Labour, where he rejected Frederick Taylor's proposal to turn man into a machine. Dull monotonous work was a temporary necessity until a corresponding machine can be developed.

In 1948 posed the problem of relations as conscious selective contacts of a person with the material and social milieu determining the person's mental characteristics and qualities and actualizing it the person's activity. In 1960 he developed common works of relations problem. Relationship Psychology deals with conscious attitude of a person towards his environment and himself ensuring synthetic and dynamic understanding of personality as oneness of subject and object.

Books

Further reading
 Вассерман, Л. И., Иовлев, Б. В., Карвасарский, Б. Д., Карпова, Э. Б. В. Н. Мясищев и медицинская психология (к 110-летию со дня рождения и 30-летию со дня смерти)// «Обозрение психиатрии и медицинской психологии», 2004, Т. 1, № 1. (idem)
 Левченко, Е.В. М.Я. Басов и В.Н. Мясищев: общность судеб, близость идей// «Обозрение психиатрии и медицинской психологии», 2005, № 2.

See also
 Vladimir Bekhterev

References

External links
 Myasishchev Vladimir Nikolaevich at encspb.ru
  at hilarygray.btinternet.co.uk
 V.N. Myasischev at bekhterev.spb.ru 

1893 births
1973 deaths
Soviet neurologists
Soviet psychologists
Burials at Bogoslovskoe Cemetery
20th-century psychologists